Uzbekistan competed at the 2020 Winter Youth Olympics in Lausanne, Switzerland from 9 to 22 January 2020.

Alpine skiing

Girls

See also
Uzbekistan at the 2020 Summer Olympics

References

2020 in Uzbekistani sport
Nations at the 2020 Winter Youth Olympics
Uzbekistan at the Youth Olympics